The  was an army of the Imperial Japanese Army during World War II.

History
The Japanese 37th Army was formed as Borneo Defence Army, a garrison force organised on 11 April 1942 under the Southern Expeditionary Army Group following the Japanese invasion and occupation of the British protectorates of Sarawak, Brunei, North Borneo on the island of Borneo.

On 12 September 1944, with the threat of possible landings of Allied forces to retake the former colonial territories in Southeast Asia increasing, the organisational structure of the Southern Expeditionary Army changed, and the Borneo Defence Army was re-designated the Japanese Thirty-Seventh Army.

The Japanese 37th Army was undermanned and poorly equipped, with most equipment and experienced units shifted toward more critical areas of the Southwest Pacific front. Nonetheless, it put up a stiff resistance to landings by Australian troops in the Borneo campaign of 1945, notably during the Battle of North Borneo.

The Japanese 37th Army was demobilised at the surrender of Japan on 15 August 1945 at Kuching.

List of commanders

Commanding officer

Chief of Staff

See also
Borneo campaign (1945) order of battle
Batu Lintang camp

References

Books

External links
 
 

37
Military units and formations established in 1942
Military units and formations disestablished in 1945